Thomas Nepveu (born 24 August 2004) is a Canadian racing driver. He currently competes in the U.S. F2000 National Championship with DEForce Racing.

Career

U.S. F2000 National Championship 
In December of 2020, it was announced that Nepveu would move to the U.S. F2000 National Championship in 2021 and compete with Cape Motorsports. At the second race at Road America, he took his maiden win by a gap of 0.0679s, holding off Simon Sikes. Nepveu finished 9th at the end of the season. 

In December of 2021, Nepveu announced that he would switch to 2021 teams' champion DEForce Racing for the 2022 season.

Racing record

Career summary 

* Season still in progress.

American open-wheel racing results

U.S. F2000 National Championship 
(key) (Races in bold indicate pole position) (Races in italics indicate fastest lap) (Races with * indicate most race laps led)

* Season still in progress.

References 

2004 births
Living people
Racing drivers from Quebec
Canadian racing drivers
U.S. F2000 National Championship drivers

Karting World Championship drivers
United States F4 Championship drivers
NACAM F4 Championship drivers